Nenad Veličković (born 1962) is a Bosnian writer and playwright. He lives in Sarajevo.

Recent activity
In 2017, Nenad Veličković has signed the Declaration on the Common Language of the Croats, Serbs, Bosniaks and Montenegrins.

References

External links
Nenad Velickovic Homepage
Article (in Bosnian)

1962 births
Living people
Bosnia and Herzegovina writers
Bosnia and Herzegovina atheists
Signatories of the Declaration on the Common Language